Alan E. Willner is a professor in the Department of Electrical Engineering at the University of Southern California.  He was also president of the Optical Society in 2016.

Willner is known for his research on optical fiber communications and free-space communications.  Willner's doctoral advisor was Richard M. Osgood Jr.

He is a recipient of the Paul F. Forman Engineering Excellence Award and several other distinctions.

Education
Ph.D. in Electrical Engineering, 1988, Columbia School of Engineering and Applied Science
BA, Yeshiva University

Memberships
In early 2016, he became a member of the National Academy of Engineering. He is also an International Fellow of the U.K. Royal Academy of Engineering, as well as a Fellow of the American Association for the Advancement of Science; IEEE; National Academy of Inventors; the Optical Society (OSA); and SPIE. He received a John Simon Guggenheim Memorial Foundation Fellowship, the IEEE Eric Sumner Award, and a Presidential Faculty Fellows Award from the White House."

Willner was President of the OSA and editor in chief of several of their publications.

References

External links
Willner's home page.
Willner at Google Scholar.

Year of birth missing (living people)
Living people
Optical physicists
Laser researchers
Fellows of Optica (society)
Presidents of Optica (society)
University of Southern California faculty
Columbia School of Engineering and Applied Science alumni
Yeshiva University alumni
Members of the United States National Academy of Engineering
Fellows of the Royal Academy of Engineering
Fellows of the American Association for the Advancement of Science
Fellow Members of the IEEE